The Bracken School Readiness Assessment ("BSRA") is an individual concept knowledge test designed for children, pre-K through second grade.

The BSRA was developed by Bruce A. Bracken and first published in 2002 by The Psychological Corporation. Raw scores can be converted to percentile rank scores and standard scores. The publisher has supporting guides for converting standard scores into criterion categories (e.g. "advanced" or "delayed"). Reliability measures were within expected ranges given the age of the students. Validity was assessed using other published assessments (e.g. WPPSI-R, DAS). The BSRA Spanish Edition was developed, normed, and validated independently. The BSRA can be used with children as young as 2.6 years of age. The BSRA is composed of the first six subtests from the revised Bracken Basic Concepts Scale (BBCS-R).

Skills tested
The test assesses six basic skills:
Colors  Student must identify common colors by name.
Letters  Students must identify upper-case and lower-case letters.
Numbers | Counting  Student must identify single- and double-digit numerals, and must count objects.
Sizes  Student must demonstrate knowledge of words used to depict size (e.g., tall, wide, etc.)
Comparisons  Student must match or differentiate objects based on a specific characteristic.
Shapes  Student must identify basic shapes by name.

Notes

References
Pearson Group

Further reading

External links
 
 Sage Publications:  Journal of Psychoeducational Assessment
 Bruce A. Bracken, PhD

Standardized tests
Cognitive tests
Intelligence tests